GRB 060729 was a gamma-ray burst that was first observed on 29 July 2006. It is likely the signal of a type Ic supernova—the core collapse of a massive star. It was also notable for its extraordinarily long X-ray afterglow, detectable 642 days (nearly two years) after the original event. The event was remote, with a redshift of 0.54.

References
Citations

Sources

20060729
060729
Pictor (constellation)
July 2006 events